Camenzind may refer to:

 Camenzind, Swiss German surname
 30000 Camenzind, main belt asteroid